El Kef Radio is a public local radio station created on November 7, 1991. It broadcasts from El Kef city targeting locals of North West Tunisia.

Content 
The radio broadcasts 18 hours a day with content targeting mainly the audiences of North West Tunisia with diverse programming.

Broadcast

FM
Available only in Northern West of Tunisia. The frequencies vary from region to region. Sometimes the service is available in different frequencies.
 102.2 MHz
 88.2 MHz
 92.2 MHz
 96.8 MHz

Internet
The Internet service is not yet available, but there are some recorded programs on the Tunisian Radio website.

See also
 Tunisia Radio Website

Radio stations in Tunisia